Sosnovka is a rural locality (a village) in Korotovskoye Rural Settlement, Cherepovetsky District, Vologda Oblast, Russia. The population was 278 as of 2002. There are 14 streets.

Geography 
Sosnovka is located 64 km southwest of Cherepovets (the district's administrative centre) by road. Korotovo is the nearest rural locality.

References 

Rural localities in Cherepovetsky District